Chung Hyeon was the defending champion but chose not to defend his title.

Stéphane Robert won the title after defeating Calvin Hemery 7–6(7–1), 6–7(5–7), 6–1 in the final.

Seeds

Draw

Finals

Top half

Bottom half

References
Main Draw
Qualifying Draw

Kobe Challenger - Singles
2017 Singles